is a Japanese former footballer who last played as a central-midfielder for Albirex Niigata Singapore.

Club

Albirex Niigata (S) 
He joins the Singapore team in 2020.    He made 9 appearances as a substitute for the season.

His contract was extended for the 2021 season.   He made ten appearances as a substitute for the season.

It was announced on 21 November 2021 that his contract was extended for the 2022 season.

Career statistics

Club

Notes

References

2001 births
Living people
Sportspeople from Yamagata Prefecture
Association football people from Yamagata Prefecture
Japanese footballers
Japanese expatriate footballers
Association football midfielders
Singapore Premier League players
Albirex Niigata players
Albirex Niigata Singapore FC players
Japanese expatriate sportspeople in Singapore
Expatriate footballers in Singapore